Gastroxides is a genus of horse flies in the family Tabanidae.

Species
Gastroxides ater Saunders, 1842
Gastroxides ornatus (Bigot, 1859)
Gastroxides shirakii Ôuchi, 1939

References

Brachycera genera
Tabanidae
Diptera of Asia
Taxa named by William Wilson Saunders